Kaba Town is a community in Gardnersville, Greater Monrovia District, Liberia. Kaba Town is part of the Montserrado-11 electoral district.

References

Communities of the Greater Monrovia District